Cauconians or Kaukani or Cauconiatae is the name of an ancient tribe in Anatolia mentioned by Strabo. By his time he writes that they were extinct.

References

Ancient peoples of Anatolia